Aneurin may refer to:

Aneurin, an alternative name for thiamine (vitamin B1)

Aneurin Barnard (born 1987), Welsh actor
Aneurin Bevan (1897–1960), Welsh politician
Aneurin Hughes (1937–2000), British diplomat
Aneurin Jones (1930–2017), Welsh artist

See also
Aneirin, a 6th- or 7th-century Brythonic bard